Chun may refer to:

Places
 Chun River in Thailand
 Chun District in Phayao Province, Thailand
 Chûn Castle, a hillfort in the United Kingdom
 Commandery (China), an administrative division of imperial China

People and names
 Jeon (Korean surname), a common Korean surname spelled Chun by about 5% of its bearers
 Cheon (Korean surname), a less common Korean surname spelled Chun by about 40% of its bearers
 Joon (Korean name), a rare Korean surname spelled Chun in the McCune–Reischauer romanisation
 Chen (surname), a Chinese surname also spelled Chun
 Carl Chun (1852–1914), German zoologist
 Chun (Bible), a biblical name
 Prince Chun (disambiguation), the title of various princes of the Chinese Qing Dynasty

Other
 Ch'un, a type of Chinese clam monster
 Chun (season), the Chinese season of spring

See also
 Qian (disambiguation)